Nurhayati Srihardini Siti Nukatin Coffin (29 February 1936 – 4 December 2018), better known by her pen name Nh. Dini (sometimes NH Dini in English), was an Indonesian novelist and feminist. She was the youngest of five children of Saljowidjojo and Kusaminah. One branch of the family can be traced back to the Bugis of South Sulawesi.

Life
Dini said that she began to love writing when she was in the second grade. Her mother was a batik artist, inspired by Javanese culture. She would read stories and poems to Dini that were written in the traditional Javanese alphabet. Her talent for writing fiction was soon confirmed. At the age of fifteen she read her poems on RRI (the state radio network) in Semarang.

In 1956, while working as a flight attendant for Garuda Indonesia Airways, she published a series of stories called Dua Dunia (Two Worlds). She also worked briefly as a radio announcer.

In 1960, she married Yves Coffin, French consul to Kobe, Japan. Two children were born of their marriage: Marie-Claire Lintang and Pierre-Louis Padang, who is widely known for co-directing all four films in the Despicable Me franchise. She initially lived with her husband in Japan; they were then posted to Phnom Penh. They returned to France in 1966. Later, they were posted to Manila. In 1976, they were posted to Detroit.

The couple were divorced in 1984. She returned to Indonesia and later reclaimed her Indonesian nationality. For many years, she operated a non-profit agency devoted to juvenile literacy.

She received the S.E.A. Write Award in 2003, when she was living in Sleman, near Yogyakarta. Towards the end of her life, she moved to a nursing home, where she had to suspend work on a novel and her memoirs due to worsening attacks of vertigo. She spent her last years in a Catholic retirement home in Semarang.

Death
Dini died on 4 December 2018 as a result of a vehicle collision between the Toyota Avanza taxi car she rode in and a truck in a highway in Semarang. Her body was cremated on the next day in Ambarawa.

Legacy
On February 29, 2020, Google celebrated her 84th birthday with a Google Doodle.

Publications

Indonesian

Novels
 Hati yang Damai (The Peaceful Heart) (1961) 
 Pada Sebuah Kapal (Aboard a Ship) (1973)
 La Barka (1975)
 Namaku Hiroko (My Name is Hiroko) (1977)
 Orang-orang Trans (The Transmigrants) (1985)
 Pertemuan Dua Hati (The Meeting of Two Hearts) (1986)

English
 A Journey (short story) in "Black Clouds Over the Isle of Gods", edited by David Roskies. M. E. Sharpe (1997) 
 The Chicken (short story) in "Diverse Lives" edited by Jeanette Lingard, Oxford Asia (1995)

References

1936 births
2018 deaths
Bugis people
Indonesian feminists
Feminist writers
20th-century Indonesian women writers
Javanese people
People from Semarang
Road incident deaths in Indonesia
Pseudonymous women writers
20th-century pseudonymous writers